Pamphlebia is a monotypic moth genus in the family Geometridae described by Warren in 1897. Its only species, Pamphlebia rubrolimbraria, was first described by Achille Guenée in 1857. It is found in Sri Lanka, Borneo, Indonesia, Taiwan and Australia.

The species' wingspan is 20 mm. Adults are greenish with narrow brown margins to their wings. The caterpillar is a minor pest of Oryza sativa (Asian rice).

References

External links
Novel components of the sex pheromones produced by emerald moths: identification, synthesis, and field evaluation.

Hemitheini
Moths of Asia
Moths described in 1857
Monotypic moth genera